is a 1987 overhead run and gun arcade game by Data East.

Gameplay

Terrorists have seized the underground control complex of a nuclear missile site, and it is up to the player to infiltrate the base and kill the enemy leader. Players begin armed with a gun with unlimited ammunition and a limited supply of grenades. Improved weapons and grenade powerups are made available within the game, either in plain sight or within crates that must be unlocked using keys. Additionally, crates may contain orbs or one of the six pieces of the Heavy Barrel superweapon. Like SNK's Ikari Warriors, the original arcade version featured 8-way rotary joysticks.

The name of the game is from an in-game weapon. The Heavy Barrel is found in six pieces and is an energy cannon capable of destroying any enemy in the game with a single shot (except the final enemy, and possibly one other boss that may have required two shots). The weapon has a wide arc of fire and can be fired as fast as the player's trigger finger permits, but after thirty seconds its use is exhausted, at which point the bearer reverts to his previous weaponry. The Heavy Barrel is best used to get past tough bosses, and the game only contains enough pieces to allow the weapon to be built three times in a single game. In a two-player game, whoever collects the sixth piece is equipped with the Heavy Barrel.

Ports
 Heavy Barrel was ported by Quicksilver Software to the Apple II and DOS in 1989. The NES port was developed by Data East and released in North America and Japan in 1990. All versions of Heavy Barrel were published by Data East.
 In 1989, Heavy Barrel was contracted to be ported to the Commodore 64 by F.A.C.S. (Financial Accounting and Computing Software), a West Bloomfield Township, Michigan company. The graphics engine and much of the game-play was in place, but the development company folded before the project could be finished.
 In February 2010, Majesco Entertainment released a port of Heavy Barrel for the Wii (as part of the Data East Arcade Classics disc) and for the Zeebo.

Reception 

In Japan, Game Machine listed Heavy Barrel on their January 15, 1988 issue as being the sixth most-successful table arcade unit of the month. Both Computer and Video Gamess Clare Edgeley and ACEs Andy Smith gave an overall positive outlook to the arcade original.

Notes

References

External links 
 Heavy Barrel at GameFAQs
 Heavy Barrel at Giant Bomb
 Heavy Barrel at Killer List of Videogames
 Heavy Barrel at MobyGames

1987 video games
Apple II games
Arcade video games
Cooperative video games
Data East arcade games
Data East video games
DOS games
Multiplayer and single-player video games
Nintendo Entertainment System games
Quicksilver Software games
Run and gun games
Video games developed in Japan
Tiger Electronics handheld games